The Outstanding Latino/a Cultural Award in Literary Arts or Publications is one of several awards presented by the American Association of Hispanics in Higher Education, Inc. (AAHHE); it also sponsored by AT&T. The award is presented to Latinas/os whose literature, scholarship, and other publications have made significant contributions to the understanding of Hispanic community and/or culture.

The award is presented annually based on the author's achievements in fiction, non-fiction, and/or newspaper editing. Nominations are open, but the winners are selected by a committee of AAHHE Board members. Winners are recognized at the Annual AAHHE National Conference.

Recent winners include:

2020 Juan Felipe Herrera
2019 John A. Lopez
2018 Laurie Ann Guerrero
2017 Ana Castillo
2016 Juan Felipe Herrera
2015 Rolando Hinojosa-Smith
2014 Octavio Roca
2013 Benjamin Saenz
2012 Alma Flor Ada
2011 Chon Noriega
2010	Francisco Aragón
2009	Bessy Reyna
2008	Javier Ávila
2007	Helena Maria Viramontes 
2006	Edward Gonzales
2005	Cordelia Chávez Candelaria
2004	Alberto Rios
2003	Rudolfo Anaya
2002	Juan Delgado
2001	Teófilo Jaime Chahín
1996	Nicholas Kanellos & Gary D. Keller

External links
Home page

References

American literary awards
Hispanic and Latino American literature
Awards honoring Hispanic and Latino Americans
Literary awards honoring minority groups